Liberty County Courthouse is a historic two-story domed redbrick government building located at 100 Main Street in Hinesville, Liberty County, Georgia, Built in 1926, it was designed by J. J. Baldwin in the Classical Revival style of architecture. Architecturally complementary wings were added in 1965. On September 18, 1980, it was added to the National Register of Historic Places.

Photo

References

Courthouses on the National Register of Historic Places in Georgia (U.S. state)
Neoclassical architecture in Georgia (U.S. state)
Buildings and structures in Liberty County, Georgia
County courthouses in Georgia (U.S. state)
Government buildings completed in 1926
National Register of Historic Places in Liberty County, Georgia
1926 establishments in Georgia (U.S. state)